Poincaré sphere may refer to:
 Poincaré sphere (optics), a graphical tool for visualizing different types of polarized light
 Bloch sphere, a related tool for representing states of a two-level quantum mechanical system
 Poincaré homology sphere, in mathematics, an example of a homology sphere